Deenwood is a census-designated place (CDP) in Ware County, Georgia, United States. The population was 1,836 at the 2000 census. It is part of the Waycross Micropolitan Statistical Area. Deenwood Baptist Church is named after this geographical area.

Geography
Deenwood is located at  (31.238993, -82.371540).

Demographics

As of the 2010 United States Census, there were 2,146 people living in the CDP. The racial makeup of the CDP was 80.8% White, 14.4% Black, 0.2% Native American, 1.2% Asian and 1.8% from two or more races. 1.5% were Hispanic or Latino of any race.

At the 2000 census, there were 1,836 people, 761 households and 554 families living in the CDP. The racial makeup of the CDP was 91.45% White, 7.46% African American, 0.54% Asian, 0.11% Pacific Islander, 0.22% from other races, and 0.22% from two or more races. Hispanic or Latino of any race were 0.71% of the population.

There were 761 households, of which 29.2% had children under the age of 18 living with them, 58.9% were married couples living together, 10.8% had a female householder with no husband present, and 27.2% were non-families. 25.2% of all households were made up of individuals, and 10.1% had someone living alone who was 65 years of age or older. The average household size was 2.40 and the average family size was 2.84.

Age distribution was 22.7% under the age of 18, 8.1% from 18 to 24, 26.3% from 25 to 44, 25.9% from 45 to 64, and 17.0% who were 65 years of age or older. The median age was 41 years. For every 100 females, there were 91.1 males. For every 100 females age 18 and over, there were 86.4 males.

The median household income was $35,559, and the median family income was $44,167. Males had a median income of $32,250 versus $25,446 for females. The per capita income for the CDP was $17,074. About 10.4% of families and 14.9% of the population were below the poverty line, including 15.2% of those under age 18 and 21.6% of those age 65 or over.

In 1990 the population was 2055.

Climate
The climate in this area is characterized by relatively high temperatures and evenly distributed precipitation throughout the year.  According to the Köppen Climate Classification system, Deenwood has a humid subtropical climate, abbreviated "Cfa" on climate maps.

References

Census-designated places in Ware County, Georgia
Waycross, Georgia micropolitan area